Shabo may refer to:

Shabo language;
Shabo, Odesa Oblast, Ukraine;
Shabo, Kale, Myanmar.